Sean P. Doctor (born July 10, 1966) is a former American football running back who played two seasons in the Arena Football League (AFL) with the Charlotte Rage and Buffalo Destroyers. He was drafted by the Buffalo Bills in the sixth round of the 1989 NFL Draft. He played college football at Marshall University. Sean Doctor was also a member of the Raleigh–Durham Skyhawks of the World League of American Football (WLAF).

College career
Doctor played college football for the Marshall Thundering Herd. He was an All-American and first team All-Southern Conference selection  as a tight end in 1987 and 1988. He helped the Thundering Herd advance to the 1987 NCAA Division I-AA Football Championship Game by recording 1,372 receiving yards as a junior, setting a school record for tight ends. Doctor was inducted into the Marshall University Athletics Hall of Fame in 2000.

Professional career
Doctor was selected by the Buffalo Bills of the National Football League (NFL) with the 164th pick in the 1989 NFL Draft. In August 1989, he was suspended by the NFL for the last game of the preseason and the first three games of the regular season for using steroids. He played for the Raleigh–Durham Skyhawks of the WLAF during the 1991 season. Doctor played for the AFL's Charlotte Rage in 1993. He played for the Buffalo Destroyers of the AFL in 1999.

References

External links
Just Sports Stats

Living people
1966 births
Players of American football from Buffalo, New York
American football running backs
American football tight ends
Marshall Thundering Herd football players
Buffalo Bills players
Raleigh–Durham Skyhawks players
Charlotte Rage players
Buffalo Destroyers players